Phantom of the Theatre is a 2016 Chinese thriller film directed by Raymond Yip, starring Ruby Lin, Tony Yang, Simon Yam, and Huang Lei. The film depicts a story set in Shanghai during the 1930s, representing the prosperity and charm of Shanghai in its peak time, with distinctive characteristics of that time and irreproachably interpreting the humanity. It was released in China on 29 April 2016.

Premise
A haunted theatre, filled with the vengeful spirits of a tragically-trapped performance troupe murdered in a fire 13 years ago, waits for the once-grand palatial playhouse to re-open with a new show and bring in new victims. The Phantom of the Theatre depicts a tragic love story between rising film star Meng Sifan and young director Gu Weibang, the son of the warlord Gu Mingshan.

Cast
 Ruby Lin as Meng Sifan / Kong Lan / Kong Jin
 Zhang Zifeng as young Kong Lan
 Yang "Tony" Youning as Gu Weibang
 Yam "Simon" Tat-wah as Gu Mingshan
 Jing Gangshan as Kong Shen
 Huang Huan as Fei Lisi
 Lin Jiangguo as Tang Shirao
 Hu Ming as The Adjutant
 Meng "Natalie" Yao as Pan Ruyu
 Wu Xudong as Liu Kang
 Ha "Patricia" Manjing as Weibang's mother
 Han Zhi as The Butler
 Li Xiaochuan as Ma Rulong
 Huang Lei as The Theatre Owner
 Luo Tianjiao as Xiao Mei
 Du Changrui as Actress
 Li Jiaxuan as Actress
 Li Ching as Master of Ceremony
 He Yunwei as Master of Ceremony
 Li Yang as The Thief

Production
The film cast is led by Ruby Lin, Raymond Yip, and Manfred Wong, their third collaboration working together on horror films. Phantom of the Theatre was filmed in Shanghai,  where shooting of the film started on 13 January 2015 and was wrapped up on 3 March 2015.

Release
The film was moved from its scheduled release date of 27 November 2015, to 28 April 2016.

Reception
The film grossed  on its opening weekend in China.

Soundtrack

Solo vocalist (female): Zhu Zirong
Solo vocalist (male): Chen Zhiyi (Yu Peng)
Violin solo: Piao Ying, Zhang Suchen
Cello solo: Chen Xiaolong
Flute: Chen Kun
Oboe: Zhang Xin
Bassoon: Hu Yu
Horn: Guo Zhanbao, Shi Jieliang
Trombone: Liu Zhanyi
Tuba: Mou Xianquan
Chinese flute: Tu Huabing
Pipa: Xie Yudan
Erhu: Lu Yiwen
Choir: Zhu Zhirong, Chen Qin, Fu Xiaoli, Wu Jing, Wang Guofang, Jiang Bin, Zhang Chaojun, Guo Junyu, Chen Zhiyi (Yu Peng)
Strings: Shanghai Piao Ying Chamber Music Group
Recording studio: Shanghai San You Recording Occupation Studio
Recording engineer: Lu Xiaoxing
Mixing engineer: Chen Zhiyi (Yu Peng)
Music producer: Anders Lee

References

External links
 
 
 Phantom of the Theatre at Variety
 Phantom of the Theatre at Rotten Tomatoes
 
 
 Wellgo Entertainment Official Page at wellgousa.com
 Official Weibo at weibo.cn

Chinese thriller films
2016 thriller films
Chinese 3D films
2016 3D films
Films set in Shanghai
Films shot in Shanghai
Films set in China
Films shot in China
Films directed by Raymond Yip
2016 films
Films set in the 1930s
Polybona Films films
Hong Kong thriller films
Huaxia Film Distribution films
2010s Mandarin-language films
2010s Hong Kong films